Huntersville may refer to:

Places
United States
 Huntersville, Indiana
 Huntersville, Maryland, St. Mary's County
 Huntersville, Minnesota
 Huntersville, North Carolina
 Huntersville, New York
 Huntersville, Ohio, an unincorporated community
 Huntersville, Virginia, a neighborhood in Norfolk
 Huntersville, West Virginia
 Huntersville Township, Minnesota

See also
 Hunterville